France 3 Côte d'Azur is one of France 3s regional services broadcasting in French and Provençal audio tracks. The service broadcasts to people living in the Provence-Alpes-Côte d'Azur region. It is headquartered in Antibes.

France 3 Côte d'Azur was launched in 1964 as RTF Télé-Marseille. The service is available on terrestrial television and cable in Provence-Alpes-Côte d'Azur. It is also available on cable in Monaco.

Presenters
 Vincent Capus
 Jacqueline Pozzi
 Véronique Lupo
 Olivier Orsini
 Jean-Bernard Vitiello

Programming
 19/20 Côte d'Azur
 19/20 Nice
 19/20 Toulon-Var
 12/13 Côte d'Azur
 Soir 3 Côte d'Azur

See also
 France 3
 France 3 Provence-Alpes

References

External links 
  

03 Cote d'Azur
Television channels and stations established in 1964
Mass media in Antibes